Warren National Park is a national park in the South West region of Western Australia,  south of Perth and  south of Pemberton.

The park is dominated by old growth karri trees, some of which are almost  in height. Some of these trees were used to act as fire lookout towers built during the 1930s and 1940s. The  Dave Evans Bicentennial Tree is situated within the park and was pegged in 1988 as part of Australia's bicentennial celebrations. This is one of three trees found around Pemberton that tourists are able to climb.

The Warren River flows through the park along with many smaller creeks and gullies. The river is plentiful in trout and marron which can be caught in season.

See also
 Protected areas of Western Australia

References

National parks of Western Australia
Forests of Western Australia
Warren bioregion
Protected areas established in 1977
1977 establishments in Australia
Sclerophyll forests